The Rolls-Royce Phantom II was the third and last of Rolls-Royce's 40/50 hp models, replacing the New Phantom in 1929. It used an improved version of the New Phantom engine in an all-new chassis. A "Continental" version, with a short wheelbase and stiffer springs, was offered.

Description

Drivetrain
The Phantom II used a refinement of the New Phantom's 7.7 L pushrod-OHV straight-6 engine with a new crossflow cylinder head. Unlike on previous 40/50 hp models, the engine was bolted directly to the 4-speed manual transmission. Synchromesh was added on gears 3 and 4 in 1932 and on gear 2 in 1935. Power was transmitted to the rear wheels using an open driveshaft, a hypoid bevel final drive, and Hotchkiss drive, replacing the torque tube from a remotely mounted gearbox used on earlier 40/50 hp models.

Chassis

The chassis of the Phantom II was completely new.  The front axle was mounted on semi-elliptical leaf springs as on earlier 40/50 hp models, but the rear axle was now also mounted on semi-elliptical springs instead of cantilever springs.  This, along with the drivetrain changes, allowed the frame to be lower than before, improving the handling. The 4-wheel servo-assisted brakes from the Phantom I were continued, and the Bijur centralized lubrication system from the Springfield-built Phantom I was included on all Phantom II chassis.

A  short-wheelbase chassis was also available.

A total of 1,681 Phantom II chassis of all types were built.

"Continental" model

Henry Royce had body designer Ivan Evernden design him a one-off short-wheelbase Phantom II. Designated 26EX, the car had a tuned engine, five-leaf springs that were stiffer than standard and a Barker four-seat lightweight close-coupled saloon body painted with an artificial pearl lacquer made from ground herring scales. The sales department initially showed no interest in 26EX but, when Evernden returned to the office from the 1930 Biarritz Grand Concours d'Elegance, where 26EX had won the Grand Prix d'Honneur, he found that the sales department had already announced the new "Phantom II Continental Saloon", prepared a brochure for it, and costed it.

According to Evernden, neither he, Royce, nor the Rolls-Royce sales department had written specifications for the "Continental" model, although he and Royce had a clear specification in mind.  Based on Evernden's writings and examination of company records, historian Ray Gentile determined that the common specifications of the Continental chassis were the short wheelbase and stiffer, five-leaf springs.  By this definition, two hundred and eighty-one Continental Phantom II's were produced,  including 125 left-hand drive versions.

Regarded as the two most important P-II Continentals are 20MS and 2SK, the only two P-II Continental Roadsters ever built. 20MS has been in a private Mid-Atlantic collection since 1989, 2SK, the Thrupp and Maberly Roadster once owned by Tyrone Power, was in the Fred Buess collection since 1958 but was sold at auction in 2010. Most Continentals were sports saloons, but various body styles were produced on the Continental chassis, including formal sedanca de villes, sporting open roadsters, and closed coupes meant for long-distance touring. Most were bodied by British coachbuilders, such as Barker, Hooper, H.J. Mulliner and Windovers, but various other coachbuilders in Europe, Australia and the United States built bodies for the Continentals, including Kellner of Paris, Martin & King of Sydney, and Brewster of New York City.

US-market versions
All Phantom II rolling chassis were built at Rolls-Royce's factory in Derby.  The factory in Springfield, Massachusetts was closed upon ending production of the US-market Phantom I/New Phantom in 1931. Two US-market series, AJS and AMS, were built at Derby. 

It competed with the recently introduced Lincoln Model K, Chrysler Imperial, Mercedes-Benz 770, Duesenberg Model J, Packard Eight, and the Cadillac Series 355. The left-hand-drive configuration was unsurprisingly most popular in the United States and Canada, but customers in Monaco, Denmark, Switzerland and Poland also purchased left-hand-drive chassis, which were not regularly available outside the USA.

Bodywork

Only the chassis and mechanical parts were made by Rolls-Royce. The body was made and fitted by a coachbuilder selected by the owner. Some of the most famous coachbuilders who produced bodies for Rolls-Royce cars are Park Ward, Brewster, Thrupp & Maberly, Mulliner, Carlton, Windovers, and Hooper.

Phantom II in films

The Phantom II was featured in the films The Sorcerer's Apprentice and Indiana Jones and the Last Crusade. When its specifications are quoted during the scene in the Kingdom of Hatay, the Sultan states that the Rolls-Royce Phantom II has a "4.3 litre, 30 horsepower, six cylinder engine, with Stromberg downdraft carburetor" and "can go from zero to 100 kilometers an hour in 12.5 seconds (and I even like the color)." However, the car used in the film was actually a Rolls-Royce Barker Saloon, with 20/25 hp. It is also the star of the 1964 film The Yellow Rolls-Royce where its engine specifications are given as the engine having a bore of 4.5" and stroke of 5.5", which would equate to 525 cubic inches

Pocher Model Kits 
Pocher models are recognised as some of the most complex and detailed automobile kits ever made, and 
they released 2 1/8th scale museum level model kits of the Phantom II:

 Pocher Rolls-Royce Phantom II Sedanca Coupe 1932 1:8 K72 Tyco Kit K 72 
 Pocher Rolls-Royce Torpedo Phanton II Convertible with 2,905 parts.

Production
 Phantom II: 1400
 Phantom II Continental: 281
 Phantom II Experimental: 9
Total production: 1,681 total cars

See also
Rolls-Royce Motors
List of Rolls-Royce motor cars

References

Sources

External links

 Rolls-Royce Phantom II .Pictures

Rolls-Royce Phantom
Cars introduced in 1929
1930s cars